Meri is a commune in Diamaré Department, Cameroon. In 2005, the population was recorded at 86834.

See also
Communes of Cameroon

References 

Communes of Far North Region (Cameroon)